A thermoset polymer matrix is a synthetic polymer reinforcement where polymers act as binder or matrix to secure in place incorporated particulates, fibres or other reinforcements. They were first developed for structural applications, such as  glass-reinforced plastic radar domes on aircraft and graphite-epoxy payload bay doors on the Space Shuttle.

They were first used after World War II, and continuing research has led to an increased range of thermoset resins, polymers or plastics, as well as engineering grade thermoplastics. They were all developed for use in the manufacture of polymer composites with enhanced and longer-term service capabilities. Thermoset polymer matrix technologies also find use in a wide diversity of non-structural industrial applications.

The foremost types of thermosetting polymers used in structural composites are benzoxazine resins, bis-maleimide resins (BMI), cyanate ester resins, epoxy (epoxide) resins, phenolic (PF) resins, unsaturated polyester (UP) resins, polyimides, polyurethane (PUR) resins, silicones, and vinyl esters.

Benzoxazine resins

These are made by the reaction of phenols, formaldehyde and primary amines which at elevated temperatures (400 °F (200 °C)) undergo ring–opening polymerisation forming polybenzoxazine thermoset networks; when hybridised with epoxy and phenolic resins the resulting ternary systems have glass transition temperatures in excess of 490 °F (250 °C). 

Cure is characterised by expansion rather than shrinkage and uses include structural prepregs, liquid molding and film adhesives for composite construction, bonding and repair. The high aromatic content of the high molecular weight polymers provides enhanced mechanical and flammability performance compared to epoxy and phenolic resins.

Bis-maleimides (BMI)

Formed by the condensation reaction of a diamine with maleic anhydride, and processed basically like epoxy resins ( cure). After an elevated post-cure, they will exhibit superior properties.

This thermoset polymer type is merged into composites as a prepreg matrix used in electrical printed circuit boards, and for large scale structural aircraft – aerospace composite structures, etc. It is also used as a coating material and as the matrix of glass reinforced pipes, particularly in high temperature and chemical environments.

Cyanate ester resins

The reaction of bisphenols or multifunctional phenol novolac resins with cyanogen bromide or chloride leads to cyanate functional monomers which can be converted in a controlled manner into cyanate ester functional prepolymer resins by chain extension or copolymerization. When postcured, all residual cyanate ester functionality polymerises by cyclotrimerisation leading to tightly crosslinked polycyanurate networks with high thermal stability and glass transition temperatures up to 752 °F (400 °C) and wet heat stability up to around 400 °F (200 °C).

Cyanate ester resin prepregs combine the high temperature stability of polyimides with the flame and fire resistance of phenolics and are used in the manufacture of aerospace structural composite components which meet fire protection regulations concerning flammability, smoke density and toxicity. Other uses include film adhesives, surfacing films and 3D printing.

Epoxy (epoxide) resins

Epoxy resins are thermosetting prepolymers made either by the reaction of epichlorohydrin with hydroxyl functional aromatics, cycloaliphatics and aliphatics or amine functional aromatics, or by the oxidation of unsaturated cycloaliphatics. The diglycidyl ethers of bisphenol-A (DGEBA) and bisphenol-F (DGEBF) are the most widely used due to their characteristic high adhesion, mechanical strength, heat and corrosion resistance. Epoxide functional resins and prepolymers cure by polyaddition/copolymerisation or homopolymerisation depending on the selection of crosslinker, hardener, curing agent or catalyst as well as by the temperature.

Epoxy resin is used widely in numerous formulations and forms in the aircraft-aerospace industry. It is regarded as "the work-horse of modern day composites". In recent years, the epoxy formulations used in composite prepregs have been fine-tuned to improve their toughness, impact strength and moisture absorption resistance. Maximum properties have been realized for this polymer.

This is not only used in aircraft-aerospace demand. It is used in military and commercial applications and is also used in construction. Epoxy-reinforced concrete and glass-reinforced and carbon-reinforced epoxy structures are used in building and bridge structures.

Epoxy composites have the following properties:

 High-Strength Glass Fiber Reinforced
 Relative Density	          1.6-2.0
 Melting temperature(°C)	
 Thermoset Processing Range(°F)	       C:300-330,I=280-380
 Molding pressure	1-5
 Shrinkage	0.001-0.008
 Tensile strength (p.s.i.) 5,000-20,000
 Compressive strength (p.s.i.)	18,000-40,000
 Flexural Strength (p.s.i.) 8000-30,000
 Izod impact strength (ft·lb/in) 0.3-10.0
 Linear expansion (10−6 in./in./°C)	11-50
 Hardness Rockwell	M100-112
 Flammability	V-0
 Water absorption 24h (%)	0.04-0.20

Epoxy Phenol Novolac (EPN) and Epoxy Cresol Novolac (ECN) resins made by reacting epichlorohydrin with multifunctional phenol novolac or cresol novolac resins have more reactive sites compared to DGEBF epoxy resins and on cure result in higher crosslink density thermosets. They are used in printed wire/circuit board laminating and also for electrical encapsulation, adhesive and coatings for metal where there is a need to provide protection from corrosion, erosion or chemical attack at high continuous operating temperatures.

Phenolic (PF) resins

There are two types of phenolic resins - novolacs and resoles. Novolacs are made with acid catalysts and a molar ratio of formaldehyde to phenol of less than one to give methylene linked phenolic oligomers; resoles are made with alkali catalysts and a molar ratio of formaldehyde to phenol of greater than one to give phenolic oligomers with methylene and benzylic ether-linked phenol units.  

Phenolic resins, originally developed in the late 19th century and, regarded as the first truly synthetic polymer types, are often referred to as the “work-horse of  thermosetting resins”. They are characterised by high bonding strength, dimensional stability and creep resistance at elevated temperatures, and frequently combined with co-curing resins such as epoxies.

General purpose molding compounds, engineering molding compounds and sheet molding compounds are the primary forms of phenolic composites. Phenolics are also used as the matrix binder with Honeycomb core. Phenolics find use in many electrical applications such as breaker boxes, brake lining materials and most recently in combination with various reinforcements in the molding of an engine block-head assembly, called the polimotor. Phenolics may be processed by the various common techniques, including compression, transfer and injection molding.

Properties of phenolic composites have the following properties:

 High-Strength Glass Fiber Reinforced
 Relative Density	     1.69-2.0
 Water Absorption 24h(%)	0.03-1.2
 Melting Temperature (◦c)	
 Thermo set Processing Range  (◦F) C:300-380 I:330-390
 Molding pressure 	I-20
 Shrinkage	0.001-0.004
 Tensile Strength (p.s.i.) 7000-18000
 Compressive Strength (p.s.i.) 16,000-70,000
 Flexural Strength (p.s.i.)12,000-60,000
 Izod Impact strength (ft-lb/in) 0.5-18.0
 Linear expansion (10−6 in./in./°C) 8-21
 Hardness Rockwell	E54-101
 Flammability	V-0

Polyester resins

Unsaturated polyester resins are an extremely versatile, and fairly inexpensive class of thermosetting polymer formed by the polycondensation of glycol mixtures often containing propylene glycol, with a dibasic acid and anhydrides usually maleic anhydride to provide backbone unsaturation needed for crosslinking, and phthalic anhydride, isophthalic acid or terephthalic acid where superior structural and corrosion resistance properties are required. Polyester resins are routinely diluted/dissolved in a vinyl functional monomer such as styrene and include an inhibitor to stabilize the resin for storage purposes. Polymerisation in service is initiated by free radicals generated from ionizing radiation or by the photolytic or thermal decomposition of a radical initiator. Organic peroxides, such as methyl ethyl ketone peroxide and auxiliary accelerators which promote decomposition to form radicals are combined with the resin to initiate a room temperature cure. 

In the liquid state, unsaturated polyester resins may be processed by numerous methods, including Hand Layup, vacuum bag molding, and spray-up and compression molded Sheet Molding Compound (SMC). They can also be B-staged after application to chopped reinforcement and continuous reinforcement, to form pre-pregs. Solid molding compounds in the form of pellets or granules are also used in processes such as compression and transfer molding.

Polyimides

There are two types of commercial polyimides: thermosetting cross-linkable polyimides made by the condensation of aromatic diamines with aromatic dianhydride derivatives and anhydrides with unsaturated sites that facilitate addition polymerisation between preformed imide monomers and oligomers, and thermoplastic polyimides formed by the condensation reaction between aromatic diamines and aromatic dianhydrides. Thermoset polyimides are the most advanced of all thermoset polymer matrices with characteristics of high temperature physical and mechanical properties and are available commercially as resin, prepreg, stock shapes, thin sheets/films, laminates, and machined parts. Along with the high temperature properties, this thermoset polymer type must be processed at very high temperatures and relative pressure to produce optimum characteristics. With prepreg materials,  to  temperatures and   pressures are required. The entire cure profiles are inherently long as there are a number of intermediate temperatures dwells, duration of which are dependent on part size and thickness. 

Polyimide composites have the following properties:
 Good mechanical properties and retention at high temperatures
 Good electrical properties
 High wear resistance
 Low creep at high temperatures
 Good compression with glass or graphite fiber reinforcement
 Good chemical resistance
 Inherently flame resistant
 Unaffected by most solvents and oils

Polyimide film possesses a unique combination of properties that make it ideal for a variety of applications in many different industries especially as excellent physical, electrical, and mechanical properties are maintained over a wide temperature range.

High-performance polyimide resin is used in electrical, wear resistant and as structural materials when combined with reinforcement for aircraft-aerospace applications, which are replacing heavier more expensive metals. High temperature processing causes some technical problems as well as higher costs compared to other polymers. Hysols  PMR series is an example of this polymer.

Polyurethane (PUR) resins

Thermoset polyurethane prepolymers with carbamate (-NH-CO-O-) links are linear and elastomeric if formed by combining diisocyanates (OCN-R1-NCO) with long chain diols (HO-R2-OH), or crosslinked and rigid if formed from combinations of polyisocyanates and, polyols. They can be solid or have an open cellular structure if foamed, and are widely used for their characteristic high adhesion and resistance to fatigue. Polyurethane foam structural cores combined with glass-reinforced or graphite-reinforced composite laminates are used to make lightweight, strong, sandwich structures. All forms of the material, inclusive of flexible and rigid foams, foam moldings, solid elastomeric moldings and extrudates, when combined with various reinforcement–fillers have found commercial applications in thermoset polymer matrix composites.

They differ from polyureas which are thermoset elastomeric polymers with carbamide (-NH-CO-NH-) links made by combining diisocyanate monomers or prepolymers (OCN-R-NCO) with blends of long-chain amine-terminated polyether or polyester resins (H2N-RL-NH2) and short-chain diamine extenders (H2N-RS-NH2). Polyureas are characterised by near instantaneous cure, high mechanical strength and resistance to corrosion so are widely used for 1:1 volume mix ratio spray applied, abrasion resistant waterproofing protective coating and lining.

Silicone resins

Silicone resins are partly organic in nature with a backbone polymer structure made of alternating silicon and oxygen atoms rather than the familiar carbon-to-carbon backbone characteristics of organic polymers. In addition to having at least one oxygen atom bonded to each silicon atom, silicone resins have direct bonds to carbon and therefore also known as polyorganosiloxanes. They have the general formula (R2SiO)n and the physical form (liquid, gel, elastomer or solid) and use varies with molecular weight, structure (linear, branched, caged) and nature of substituent groups (R = alkyl, aryl, H, OH, alkoxy). Aryl substituted silicone resins have greater thermal stability than alkyl substituted silicone resins when polymerised (condensation cure mechanism) at temperatures between ~300 °F (~150 °C) and ~400 °F (~200 °C). Heating above ~600 °F (~ 300 °C) converts all silicone polymers into ceramics since all organic constituents pyrolytically decompose leaving crystalline silicate polymers with the general formula (-SiO2-)n. In addition to applications as ceramic matrix composite precursors, silicone resins in the form of polysiloxane polymers made from silicone resins with pendant acrylate, vinyl ether or epoxy functionality find application as UV, electron beam and thermoset polymer matrix composites where they are characterised by their resistance to oxidation, heat and ultraviolet degradation.

Assorted other uses in the general area of composites for silicones include sealants, coating materials, and as a reusable bag material for vacuum-bag curing of composite parts.

Vinyl ester resins

Vinyl ester resins made by addition reactions between an epoxy resin with acrylic acid derivatives, when diluted/dissolved in a vinyl functional monomer such as styrene, polymerise. The resulting thermosets are notable for their high adhesion, heat resistance and corrosion resistance. They are stronger than polyesters and more resistant to impact than epoxies. Vinyl ester resins are used for wet lay-up laminating, SMC and BMC in the manufacture and repair of corrosion and heat resistant components ranging from pipelines, vessels and buildings to transportation, marine, military and aerospace applications.

Miscellaneous
Amino resins are another class of thermoset prepolymers formed by copolymerisation of amines or amides with an aldehyde. Urea-formaldehyde and melamine-formaldehyde resins, although not widely used in high performance structural composite applications, are characteristically used as the polymer matrix in molding and extrusion compounds where some use of fillers and reinforcements occurs. Urea-formaldehyde resins are widely used as the matrix binder in construction utility products such as particle board, wafer board, and plywood, which are true particulate and laminar composite structures. Melamine-formaldehyde resins are used for plastic laminating.  

Furan resin prepolymers made from furfuryl alcohol, or by modification of furfural with phenol, formaldehyde (methanal), urea or other extenders, are similar to amino and phenolic thermosetting resins in that cure involves polycondensation and release of water as well as heat. While they are generally cured under the influence of heat, catalysts and pressure, furan resins can also be formulated as dual-component no-bake acid-hardened systems which are characterised by high resistance to heat, acids and alkalies. Furan resins are of increasing interest for the manufacture of sustainable composites - biocomposites made from a bio-derived matrix (in this case furan resin), or biofibre reinforcement, or both.

Advantages and disadvantages

Advantages
 Well established processing and application history
 Overall, better economics than thermoplastic polymers
 Better high temperature properties
 Good wetting and adhesion to reinforcement

Disadvantages
 Resins and composite materials must be refrigerated
 Moisture absorption and subsequent property degradation
 Long process cycles
 Reduced impact –toughness
 Poor recycling capabilities
 More difficult repair ability

References

Further reading 
 
 
 
 Modern Plastic Mid-October Encyclopedia Issue, Polyimide, thermoset, p. 146.
 Varun Ratta: POLYIMIDES: Chemistry & structure-property relationships – literature review (Chapter 1).

External links
http://www.cartage.org.lb/en/themes/sciences/Chemistry/Organicchemistry/Organicindex/Polymers/Thermosetpolymers/Thermosetpolymers.htm
http://pslc.ws/macrog/lab/epoxy.htm
http://www.thefreedictionary.com/silicone+polymer
http://www.ciba.com/index/ind-index/ind-pla/ind-pla-polymersandpolymerprocessing/ind-pla-pol-polyurethane.htm
http://www.profma.com/polyimide.htm
http://www.wisegeek.com/what-is-polyester.htm

Composite materials
Polymers
Fibre-reinforced polymers